Sir James Falshaw, 1st Baronet JP, DL, FRSE (21 March 1810 – 14 June 1889), was a British railway engineer and politician.

Life

He was born in Leeds, of an "old yeoman family" and was the son of William Falshaw, wool merchant, and Hannah Shaw. He was the sixth of fourteen children. His grandfather, George, came from Coverdale in the North Riding of Yorkshire.

In youth he studied under Jonathan Lockwood and then, aged 14, he was articled to the architect and surveyor, Joseph Cusworth, and trained as an engineer and surveyor. There he befriended John Hawkshaw (later Sir John Hawkshaw).

In 1836, he went to work for George Leather, an engineer. Here he worked on Leeds Waterworks situated in Eccup. From 1837 to 1841, he worked on the Stockton and Hartlepool railway line and began to specialise in that field of work. The most impressive structure on this line was the 92 arch brick viaduct over Greatham Marsh. From 1838 to 1844, he also worked on the Bradford Waterworks.

In June 1844, he moved to Kendal to oversee the construction of the Lancaster and Carlisle Railway. In 1845, he acted as an advisor to the House of Commons on various forthcoming railway projects. In 1845, he moved to Stirling to oversee the building of the Caledonian Railway. This project involved joining to the existing Edinburgh to Glasgow line at Greenhill and extending a 100-mile line (most of which was double track) in a broad loop via Stirling and Dunblane to reach Forfar. The most impressive part of this is the mile-long Moncrieff Tunnel. This was completed by 1848.

His first wife, Anne Morkill, died in April 1864 and is buried in Whitkirk in Yorkshire.

In 1871, he married Jane Gibbs (b.1825) at the Wesleyan Methodist Chapel, Nicholson Square, Edinburgh. From 1882 to 1887 he was chairman of the North British Railway Company.

Falshaw was Lord Provost of Edinburgh between 1874 and 1877. His Town Clerk was William Skinner of Corra.

He was created a baronet, of Belgrave Crescent in the City
of Edinburgh, in 1876. He died at home, 14 Belgrave Crescent, in western Edinburgh in June 1889, aged 79, when the baronetcy became extinct.

He is buried close to his home, in Dean Cemetery, Edinburgh and has an impressive marble monument of great height and ornament over his grave. He is buried with both wives, including his second wife, Jane Gibbs, Lady Falshaw (d.1889). The grave lies on the main east-west path of the northern extension to the original cemetery.

Memorials

The main east window in St. Giles Cathedral is dedicated to James Falshaw.

Falshaw Bridge crossing the Water of Leith in Stockbridge, Edinburgh has a plaque to Falshaw.

What is now called Iona Street, east of Leith Walk was originally planned as Falshaw Street but this name only survived for ten years.

Artistic Recognition

A full-length portrait of Falshaw by Robert Herdman RSA hangs in the Old Council Chamber (now known as the Diamond Jubilee Room) in Edinburgh City Chambers.

A marble bust by John Hutchison stands in the Merchants Hall in Edinburgh.

References

External links
Sir James Falshaw, Bt, obituary
Portrait of Sir James Falshaw, Bt, by Robert Inerarity Herdman.

1810 births
1889 deaths
British railway pioneers
Baronets in the Baronetage of the United Kingdom
Fellows of the Royal Society of Edinburgh
Lord Provosts of Edinburgh
British railway civil engineers
People from Leeds
Engineers from Yorkshire
19th-century British businesspeople